Supabarn is a family owned supermarket chain based in Canberra with shops across the Australian Capital Territory (Canberra) and New South Wales in Australia with its head office located in Canberra. The chain has been in operation since 1991.

Community involvement
In 2007, Supabarn was recognised for making over $1,000,000 in donations to their local community.

Logos

1995-2012

Old Slogan: Bite Into Life

See also

List of supermarket chains in Oceania

References

External links

Supermarkets of Australia
Companies based in Canberra
Australian companies established in 1991
Retail companies established in 1991